The Mont Olivine is a mountain in Gaspésie National Park, in the unincorporated  territory of Mont-Albert, in the La Haute-Gaspésie Regional County Municipality (MRC), in the region of Gaspésie–Îles-de-la-Madeleine, in Quebec, in Canada.

Mount Olivine is one of the Chic-Choc Mountains.

Main activities 

At the top of Mount Olivine, the panorama is splendid. The bare summit allows you to admire the Mount Albert nearby. Mount Olivine is one of the only mountains in the area accessible by snowshoeing in winter.

The trailhead starts at the Discovery and Visitors Center of Gaspésie National Park. Hikers then take the La Grande Traversée trail (westbound), and pay attention to the signs indicating the direction of Mont Olivine. By first following the Sainte-Anne River, the trail turns out to be relatively flat. From the third kilometer, very close to the Devil's Fall, the ascent becomes more demanding.

After the first big stage of the climb, the hikers arrive at an intersection where the left path leads to the top of Mount Olivine. Along the way, hikers can admire the Mount Albert plateau. The return of the hike is done by doing the reverse route.

Toponymy 
The toponym "Mont Olivine" refers to the fact that a prospector found olivine near Mont Albert. Olivine is a green mineral very rich in magnesium, from the group of silicates.

The toponym "Mont Olivine" was formalized on February 7, 1989 at the place name bank of the Commission de toponymie du Québec.

See also 
 List of mountains of Quebec

Notes and references

External links 
 

La Haute-Gaspésie Regional County Municipality
Summits of Gaspésie–Îles-de-la-Madeleine
 Gaspé Peninsula
 Snowshoeing
 Chic-Chocs Summits
 Hiking trails in Canada
Mountains of Quebec under 1000 metres